Invincible Baseball Team is a South Korean TV baseball-variety show that debuted on 25 April 2009 on KBS2. Invincible Baseball Team ended in December 2010.

References

External links
 Invincible Baseball Team Official Website

2009 South Korean television series debuts
2010 South Korean television series endings
Korean Broadcasting System original programming
South Korean variety television shows
South Korean sports television series
Korean-language television shows
2010s South Korean television series
Baseball television series
Baseball teams in South Korea
Amateur baseball teams